Vince Gino Dekker (22 March 1997) is a Dutch professional footballer who plays as a left winger for SV Spakenburg.

Club career

Ajax 
Dekker came through the youth system at Ajax, where he played in every single youth category from the age of 6. He made his debut at Jong Ajax on 12 August 2016 in an Eerste Divisie game against Almere City. He played the entire match in a 4–1 away win.

AZ Alkmaar 
Dekker joined AZ Alkmaar on 8 May 2018 on a free transfer from AFC Ajax. After playing 18 matches for Jong AZ in the first half of the season, his contract was dissolved.

Go Ahead Eagles
On 10 January 2019, it was announced that Dekker had signed with Go Ahead Eagles until the end of the season with the option for another season.

SV Spakenburg
On 26 October 2019, Dekker joined Tweede Divisie club SV Spakenburg.

References

External links
 
 Vince Gino Dekker U16 NT profile at KNVB
 Vince Gino Dekker U17 NT profile at KNVB
 Vince Gino Dekker U19 NT profile at KNVB

1997 births
Living people
People from Harderwijk
Dutch footballers
Footballers from Gelderland
Association football wingers
Eerste Divisie players
Tweede Divisie players
AZ Alkmaar players
Jong Ajax players
Jong AZ players
Go Ahead Eagles players
SV Spakenburg players